Drzewica  is a town in Opoczno County, Łódź Voivodeship, Poland, with 3,778 inhabitants as of December 2021. From 1975 to 1998 the town was a part of Radom Voivodeship. Located on the Drzewiczka river (a tributary to the Pilica), in the northwestern corner of the historic province of Lesser Poland, Drzewica is home to Gerlach, a renowned cutlery manufacturer, founded in 1760 in Warsaw (since 1886 in Drzewica). In the first half of the 16th century, the Archbishop of Gniezno and Primate of Poland Maciej Drzewicki built here a rectangular-shaped castle, surrounded by a moat.  The castle burned in 1814 and now is a well-preserved ruin.

History
The town of Drzewica dates back to the 13th century, when prince Konrad I of Masovia granted the area to the Drzewicki (Ciołek coat of arms) family. The family owned Drzewica for 500 years, and its properties stretched from the Pilica to the Holy Cross Mountains. In 1429 in Nieszawa, Drzewica was incorporated as a town on German town law, by King Jogaila. Drzewica, which belonged to Opoczno County of Lesser Poland’s Sandomierz Voivodeship, prospered in the early 16th century, when its owner Maciej Drzewicki (1467 – 1535) was a personal secretary of King John I Albert. Drzewicki renovated the ancient castle, turning it from a Gothic stronghold into a Renaissance residence. During the Deluge, Drzewica was destroyed by the Swedish army.

In the 18th century Drzewica became one of early centers of Polish industry, when one of the first Polish blast furnaces was built here by Filip Szaniawski. Soon afterwards, northern Lesser Poland became industrialized (see Old-Polish Industrial Region). After the Partitions of Poland, Drzewica was annexed by the Russian Empire (1815), together with Congress Poland. The town was an important center of the January Uprising. In 1869, Tsarist authorities reduced it to the status of a village. 

On September 8, 1939, a nearby forest was the place of a bloody skirmish between Polish Army and the Wehrmacht.  The German occupation began that month.  The Jewish population of the town was around 750.  The Germans brought Jews from several neighboring villages to Drzewica so that the population increased to more than 2000.  Without livelihoods and not allowed to bring personal possessions, these newcomers lived in poverty.   In the autumn of 1941, Jews were forced to live in a ghetto  and the severe overcrowding (eight to ten people on average shared each room) there led to epidemics of both typhus and typhoid.   Police would enter the ghetto periodically to randomly murder people.  In July 1942, some Jews were taken to a labor camp while the others remained in the ghetto.  In October, the Germans surrounded the ghetto and lit fires around to prevent escape.  The Jews were rounded up and marched to Opoczno where, a few days later, they were sent to the Treblinka killing camp where they were immediately murdered by gas. The few Jews who were left behind to sort Jewish possessions were themselves rounded up a few months later and sent to the Ujazd ghetto and from there to Treblinka.  Only about five to seven Drzewica Jews are known to have survived the Holocaust.

In 1987 Drzewica regained its town status.

References

External links
 Official town website
 A Virtual Tour 360° - Castle in Drzewica (zamekdrzewica.republika.pl) 
 Jewish community of Drzewica on Virtual Shtetl

Cities and towns in Łódź Voivodeship
Opoczno County
Lesser Poland
Radom Governorate
Kielce Voivodeship (1919–1939)
Łódź Voivodeship (1919–1939)
Holocaust locations in Poland